The Bharatiya Janata Party, or simply, BJP Manipur (BJP;), 
is the state unit of the Bharatiya Janata Party of the Manipur. Its head office is situated at Nitaipai Chuthak, Keishamthong, Imphal, Manipur, 795004, India. The current president of BJP Manipur is Adhikarimayum Sharda Devi.

History

Lok Sabha Members

Rajya Sabha Members

In General Election

In State Election

See also
Bharatiya Janata Party
National Democratic Alliance
North East Democratic Alliance
National People's Party
Naga People's Front
Kuki People's Alliance

References

Bharatiya Janata Party by state or union territory